Beginning in 2011, streaming service Hulu began to produce its own original content. The first production released was the web series The Morning After, a light-hearted pop-culture news show. In 2012, Hulu announced that it would begin airing its first original scripted program, titled Battleground.

Original programming

Drama

Comedy

Animation

Adult animation

Kids & family

Unscripted

Docuseries

Reality

Variety

Co-productions
These shows have been commissioned by Hulu in cooperation with a partner network.

Continuations
These shows have been either picked up by Hulu for additional seasons after having aired previous seasons on another network, or were moved to Hulu from another network and premiered on the service without being marketed as Hulu Originals.

Specials
These programs are supplementary content related to original TV shows.

Exclusive international distribution
These television shows, although though Hulu lists them as Hulu Originals, are shows that have aired in different countries, and Hulu has exclusive distribution rights to stream them in the United States.

Drama

Comedy

Animation

Adult animation

Anime

Unscripted

Hotstar 
Disney announced that the streaming service Hotstar will no longer be available in the United States in late 2022 and will integrate into Hulu instead.

Upcoming original programming

Drama

Comedy

Animation

Adult animation

Unscripted

Docuseries

Reality

Co-productions

Continuations

Exclusive international distribution
These television shows, although though Hulu lists them as Hulu Originals, are shows that have aired or will air in different countries, and Hulu has exclusive distribution rights to stream them in the United States.

In development

Notes

References

External links
 

Hulu
Hulu